Haron bin Din (Jawi: هارون بن دين‎; 18 August 1941 – 15 September 2016) was a Malaysian politician and Muslim cleric. He was the 3rd Spiritual Leader of the Malaysian Islamic Party (PAS) from March 2015 after the death of his influential predecessor Nik Abdul Aziz Nik Mat to his own death in September 2016.

Education
 Klang Islamic College (1962-1965) - Sijil Tertinggi Kolej
 Studies Diploma from Al-Azhar, Cairo (1966-1968)
 M.A. in Sharia from Ain-Shams, Cairo University (1972-1974) - Ph.D. in Sharia
 National University of Malaysia (UKM) bestowed upon him Professorship in the year 1986.
 He wrote a lot of books. Among them are "Man and Islam", "Islamic Education Philosophy", "The Torch of Islam", "Tasawwur Islam", "Hudud in Islamic Jurisprudence" and many more.

Career
 Lecturer
 Professor
 Deputy Dean, Islamic Studies Faculty, National University of Malaysia (1977-1985)
 Syariah Advisory Panel, CIMB
 Syariah Advisory Panel, Bank Negara Malaysia
 Syariah Advisory Council, Security Commission
 Selangor Fatwa Council Member
 Assistant Director Syariah Advisory Council, Bank Pembangunan
 Chairman Syariah Advisory Council, RHB Bank
 Deputy Chairman Syariah Advisory Council,  Public Bank Berhad
 Perlis Fatwa Advisory Council.
 Syariah Advisory Council, Muamalat Financial Consulting

Politics
 PAS active member from 1974
 PAS central committee member (1975-1983)
 Central Committee Chief
 PAS Scholar council
 Vice spiritual leader of PAS

Controversies

Allah word issue
This particular issue tests the consensus of the ulema based party. Their top leaders including the likes of Nik Abdul Aziz Nik Mat and Abdul Hadi Awang, were supporting the word be used by Malaysian Catholics in their Malay version of the Bible. Haron however, opposed this idea by saying that it is an abomination for permitting such action. This caused a split in PAS as Haron was deemed as a prominent Islamic scholar. Haron stated that he did not agree to allow non-Muslim to use the word Allah.

Death
Haron died on 15 September 2016 at the Stanford University Hospital in San Francisco, California, United States at the age of 75 after being in a coma. His body was buried at Five Pillars Farm, a Muslim Cemetery at 1761 Laughlin Rd, Livermore, California. Before his departure to the United States, he told his family and party leaders that he wanted to be buried in the country where he held his last breath. Muslims believe having a quick burial following death is the best and not putting the deceased and his family members in further suffering. His family executed his wishes instead of flying the body on a long haul flight for customary burial on the home soil.

Award
Haron Din was awarded Darjah Kebesaran Dato Paduka Mahkota Selangor (DPMS) from Sultan of Selangor in 2016. However, his son received the award, on behalf of Haron Din, from Sultan of Selangor. He was also awarded posthumously special 'Maal Hijrah' award from Yang Di Pertuan Agong, Tuanku Abdul Halim Mu'adzam Shah for his contribution to Islam at national and international levels.

 :
 Knight Commander of the Order of the Crown of Selangor (DPMS) – Dato’ (2016 - posthumously)

Election results

Other references
 Darussyifa

References

1941 births
2016 deaths
Academic staff of the National University of Malaysia
People from Perlis
Malaysian people of Malay descent
Malaysian Muslims
Malaysian Islamic Party politicians
Knights Commander of the Order of the Crown of Selangor